The 1981 PBA season was the seventh season of the Philippine Basketball Association (PBA).

Board of governors

Executive committee
 Leopoldo L. Prieto (Commissioner) 
 Domingo Y. Itchon  (President, representing YCO-Tanduay)

Teams

Season highlights
Instead of the usual three-conference format, the season was shortened to two conferences to give way for the Philippines' hosting of the SEA Games in Manila. 
Rivals Toyota and Crispa played in the finals for the 10th and what turn out to be the last time during the PBA Open Conference championship series. The Super Diesels finally ended a string of three runner-up finishes from last year by winning against the Redmanizers in five games.
Toyota import Andrew Fields became the first recipient of the PBA Best Import Award.
William "Bogs" Adornado of U/Tex Wranglers won his 3rd Most Valuable Player Award.

Champions
 Open Conference: Toyota Super Diesels
 Reinforced Filipino Conference: Crispa Redmanizers
 Team with best win–loss percentage: Toyota Super Diesels (29–14, .674)
 Best Team of the Year: Crispa Redmanizers (4th)

Open Conference

Elimination round

Semifinals

Finals

|}
Best Import of the Conference: Andrew Fields (Toyota)

Reinforced Filipino Conference

Elimination round

Quarterfinals

Semifinals

Finals

|}
Best Import of the Conference: Russell Murray (Tanduay)

Awards
 Most Valuable Player: Bogs Adornado (U/Tex)
 Rookie of the Year:  Rafael Sison (Presto)
 Best Import-Open Conference: Andrew Fields (Toyota)
 Best Import-Reinforced Conference: Russell Murray (Yco-Tanduay)
 Mythical Five:
Robert Jaworski (Toyota)
Atoy Co (Crispa)
Ramon Fernandez (Toyota)
Bogs Adornado (U/Tex)
Philip Cezar (Crispa)

Cumulative standings

References

 
PBA